The James E. Simpson House is a historic house in Methuen, Massachusetts.  It is a -story house, finished in wooden clapboards, with a steeply-pitched gable roof with exposed trusses. It was built c. 1920, and features typical Craftsman features, including dormers with deep eaves supported by trusses, and half-timbering above the windows. Its porch and foundation are faced in glazed fieldstones, as is its central chimney.  The house is Methuen's finest example of the Craftsman/bungalow style.

The house was listed on the National Register of Historic Places in 1984.

See also
 National Register of Historic Places listings in Methuen, Massachusetts
 National Register of Historic Places listings in Essex County, Massachusetts

References

Houses in Methuen, Massachusetts
Houses completed in 1920
American Craftsman architecture in Massachusetts
Bungalow architecture in Massachusetts
National Register of Historic Places in Methuen, Massachusetts
Houses on the National Register of Historic Places in Essex County, Massachusetts